Macrocheles falsiglaber is a species of mite in the family Macrochelidae.

References

falsiglaber
Articles created by Qbugbot
Animals described in 2003